Scot Gemmill (born 2 January 1971) is a Scottish football coach and former professional player, who is the head coach of the Scotland under-21 team.

As a player, he was a midfielder who notably played in the Premier League for Nottingham Forest,  Everton and Leicester City, in the Football League for Preston North End and Oxford United before finishing career with the New Zealand Knights. He was capped 26 times by Scotland, scoring 1 goal.

Following retirement, Gemmill has worked as a coach for Oxford United, before taking up a role initially with the Scotland U17 team.

Club career
Gemmill started his career at Nottingham Forest as an apprentice on leaving school in the summer of 1987 and two years later he was given a professional contract by manager Brian Clough, who then gave him his first team debut on 30 March 1991 in a 3–1 defeat by Wimbledon at Plough Lane.

Gemmill established himself as a regular player in 1991–92, when he scored eight goals in 39 league games and also helped Forest win the ZDS Cup (scoring twice in the final including the winner) as well as finish runners-up in the Football League Cup. He remained a regular first team player until he was sold to Everton for £250,000 on 25 March 1999. During his 12 years at the City Ground he was involved in two promotion winning teams (1994 and 1998), three relegated teams (1993, 1997 and 1999), was part of a third-place finish in 1995, a run to the quarter finals of the UEFA Cup in 1996, and played under five different managers.

By the end of the 2002–03 season, he had played 97 Premier League games for Everton but his first team chances had become increasingly limited since David Moyes replaced Walter Smith as manager in March 2002. He did not make a single league appearances for the Toffees in the 2003–04 season, during which he spent seven games on loan at Preston North End and scored once against Bradford.

At the start of 2004–05 he ended a spell of more than five years at Goodison Park when he signed for Leicester City on a free transfer. He played 17 games in two years at the Walkers Stadium before a one-game spell at Oxford United, before he finished his career with a one-year spell at the New Zealand Knights; where he was a marquee player.

International career
Gemmill was part of the Scotland squads for the 1996 European Championships and 1998 World Cup but failed to make an appearance in either, a situation he described for the latter as "bittersweet" and "heartbreaking".

He won 26 caps for Scotland and scored one goal, against a Hong Kong League XI in a Reunification Cup match in 2002. Gemmill played his last game for Scotland in April 2003, in a 2–0 home friendly defeat to Austria, as a half-time substitute.

Coaching career
His first steps in to coaching were as a player/coach under Jim Smith at Oxford United in 2006. He then became player/coach at the New Zealand Knights in the Australian A-League.

In March 2014, he was appointed as head coach of the Scotland U17 team for the 2014 UEFA European Under-17 Championship. Gemmill was appointed Scotland U21 head coach in September 2016.

Personal life
He is the son of Scottish former international footballer Archie Gemmill.

Career statistics

Scores and results list Scotland's goal tally first.

Honours
Nottingham Forest
Football League First Division: 1997–98
Football League Cup runner-up: 1991–92
Full Members Cup: 1991–92

Individual
 PFA Team of the Year: 1993–94 First Division

References

External links 
 Scot Gemmill Interview
 Official profile from Knights FC
 

1971 births
Living people
Scottish footballers
Nottingham Forest F.C. players
Everton F.C. players
Preston North End F.C. players
Leicester City F.C. players
Oxford United F.C. players
New Zealand Knights FC players
Premier League players
Scotland international footballers
Scotland B international footballers
UEFA Euro 1996 players
1998 FIFA World Cup players
A-League Men players
English Football League players
Scottish expatriate footballers
Expatriate association footballers in New Zealand
Scotland under-21 international footballers
Scotland national under-21 football team managers
Association football midfielders
Anglo-Scots
Marquee players (A-League Men)
Scottish football managers